The 2015 Amex-Istanbul Challenger was a professional tennis tournament played on hard courts. It was the 28th edition of the tournament which was part of the 2015 ATP Challenger Tour. It took place in Istanbul, Turkey between 14 and 20 September 2015.

Singles main-draw entrants

Seeds

 1 Rankings are as of September 7, 2015.

Other entrants
The following players received wildcards into the singles main draw: 
  Barış Ergüden
  Sergiy Stakhovsky 
  Barkın Yalçınkale
  Anıl Yüksel

The following players received entry from the qualifying draw:
  Ilya Ivashka
  Mikhail Ledovskikh
  Daniel Masur
  Andrei Vasilevski

The following players received entry as a lucky loser:
  Markus Eriksson

Champions

Singles

  Karen Khachanov def.  Sergiy Stakhovsky 4–6, 6–4, 6–3

Doubles

  Andrey Kuznetsov /  Aleksandr Nedovyesov def.  Aleksandre Metreveli /  Anton Zaitcev 6–2, 5–7, [10–8]

External links
Official Website

American Express - TED Open
PTT İstanbul Cup
2015 in Turkish tennis